is a Japanese castle located in Tomioka, Reihoku Town, Amakusa District, Kumamoto Prefecture. During the 16th century, it was the castle of Terasawa Katataka, a daimyō who played a critical part in repressing the Shimabara Rebellion.

Further reading

External links
Pictures of the ruins of Tomioka Castle

Castles in Kumamoto Prefecture